Christmas Child is an EP by the band Carbon Leaf that was released on their own label, Constant Ivy Music.

Track listing

References

2010 EPs
2010 Christmas albums
Carbon Leaf albums
Christmas albums by American artists